Salvia yunnanensis is a perennial plant that is native to Yunnan, Guizhou, and Sichuan provinces in China, found growing on grassy hillsides, forest margins, and dry forests at  elevation.

Inflorescences are widely spaced 4-6-flowered verticillasters in terminal racemes or panicles, with a  blue-purple corolla.

Notes

yunnanensis
Flora of China